Hall of Nations was an exhibition hall that was inaugurated in 1972 as part of the Pragati Maidan exhibition complex in New Delhi, India.

History 
It was designed by the Indian architect Raj Rewal, and structurally engineered by Mahendra Raj. It was used for trade fair exhibitions.
 
The structure was demolished in April 2017 to make way for a new complex. The demolition of the building, which was considered iconic for its architecture, led to widespread global disapproval.  It was described in The New York Times as a "Brutalist masterpiece", and it was one of the world's largest-span space frame concrete structures, when built.

References

External links 

Buildings and structures in Delhi
1972 establishments in Delhi
Buildings and structures demolished in 2017
Demolished buildings and structures in India
Brutalist architecture